The 2022 North America and Caribbean Men's Youth Handball Championship was the first edition of the tournament, it took place in Mexico City, Mexico, from 15 to 19 November 2022. It acted as the North America and Caribbean qualifying tournament for the 2023 Men's Youth World Handball Championship.

Results
All times are local (UTC–6).

References

North America and Caribbean Youth
International handball competitions hosted by Mexico
North America
Sports competitions in Mexico City
North America